WXLT (103.5 FM, "ESPN Southern Illinois") is a radio station licensed to serve Christopher, Illinois, United States. The station is owned by Max Media and licensed to MRR License LLC. It airs a sports format.

History
WXLT was first assigned the call sign WUEZ on October 30, 1990. The station was assigned the WXLT call letters by the Federal Communications Commission on March 19, 2001, and most recently broadcast an adult hits format as "Jack FM". On February 2, 2009, WXLT switched formats to sports as "ESPN Southern Illinois". 103.5 ESPN is the radio home for Herrin Tiger football and basketball. The voice of the Tigers is Mike Murphy, and the color commentator during football season is Kenny Steelman, and during basketball season it is Jason Karnes.

Ownership
In December 2003, Mississippi River Radio, acting as Max Media LLC (John Trinder, president/COO), reached an agreement to purchase WCIL, WCIL-FM, WUEZ, WXLT, WOOZ-FM, WJPF, KGIR, KZIM, KEZS-FM, KCGQ-FM, KMAL, KLSC, KWOC, KJEZ, KKLR-FM, KGKS, and KSIM from the Zimmer Radio Group (James L. Zimmer, owner). The reported value of this 17–station transaction was $43 million.

Previous logo

References

External links
WXLT official website

XLT
Radio stations established in 1990
ESPN Radio stations
Companies based in Franklin County, Illinois
1990 establishments in Illinois
Max Media radio stations